Baldassarre Orero (June 1, 1841 – November 11, 1914) was an Italian general. He was the first Italian colonial governor of Eritrea.

Awards
Military Order of Savoy
Maurician medal
Commemorative Medal of the Unity of Italy

Notes

References
 F. Bandini, Gli italiani in Africa: Storia delle guerre coloniali. (1882-1943), Longanesi, 1971

1841 births
1914 deaths
Italian generals